Moncton Centre is a provincial electoral district for the Legislative Assembly of New Brunswick, Canada. It was contested in the 2014 general election, having been created in the 2013 redistribution of electoral boundaries.

The district includes the geographic centre of Moncton, but excludes the downtown which falls in Moncton South.

It draws about 60% of its population from the old Moncton East and about 40% from the old district of Moncton North.  Moncton East incumbent Chris Collins won the 2014 election.

Members of the Legislative Assembly

Election results

References

External links 
Website of the Legislative Assembly of New Brunswick
Map of riding as of 2018

New Brunswick provincial electoral districts
Politics of Moncton